The State Administration of Foreign Experts Affairs (SAFEA) was an agency of the government of the People's Republic of China (PRC) that operated under the State Council and the Ministry of Human Resources and Social Security. It was responsible for recruiting foreign experts outside of mainland China - including Taiwan and the special administrative regions - for work in the PRC, and managing the training of Chinese nationals outside of the PRC. It was headquartered in Zhongguancun, Haidian District, Beijing.

SAFEA founded in 1956 and abolished in March 2018, when its functions were absorbed by the Ministry of Science and Technology (MOST). The SAFEA name was retained to interact with foreign parties.

Recruitment
The fields targeted for foreign recruitment included the economy, technology, management, education, engineering, science, culture, and healthcare. Foreigners usually worked in foreign invested joint-ventures, private industry, state-owned enterprises and public construction projects.

Programs and organizations supervised
Thousand Talents Plan (TTP)
 China International Talent Exchange Foundation (CITEF)
 China Association for International Exchange of Personnel (CAIEP)
China Services International
Conference on International Exchange of Professionals

Partnerships 
SAFEA maintains partnerships with universities and professional bodies in several countries, including:

University of Maryland, College Park
 University of Wisconsin–Madison
 Project Management Institute

Reaction 
According to the 1999 Cox Report, SAFEA's CAIEP is "one of several organizations set up by the PRC for illicit technology transfer through contacts with Western scientists and engineers." In March 2022, a federal jury convicted a man of fraudulently obtaining U.S. visas for CAIEP employees.

A 2019 report by the United States Senate Homeland Security Permanent Subcommittee on Investigations stated that SAFEA's contracts with foreign experts "include provisions that violate U.S. standards of research integrity, place TTP members in compromising legal and ethical positions, and undermine fundamental U.S. scientific norms of transparency, reciprocity, and integrity." 

SAFEA has been the subject of espionage investigations. In 2010, Noshir Gowadia was convicted for selling classified information, primarily regarding the Northrop Grumman B-2 Spirit, to a SAFEA official. SAFEA has been reported to operate nominally private front organizations such as Virginia-based Triway Enterprises.

See also
Thousand Talents Plan
Industrial espionage
Friendship Award (winners are selected by the SAFEA)

References

External links 

 

Zhongguancun
1956 establishments in China
Recruitment
Brain drain
Science and technology in the People's Republic of China
Chinese intelligence agencies
Technology transfer